Louie Ernest Brown (20 May 1905 – 3 June 1947) was a New Zealand professional rugby league footballer who played in the 1920s and 1930s.

Personal life
Lou Brown was the son of Frank Brown, and Emma Catherine Brown, and the nephew of the "Harrison brothers, well known in the early days of football in this [Auckland] province".

Playing career
Brown began his career playing rugby for Te Kowhai in the Waikato, and in 1921 he transferred to the Frankton rugby club. He was renowned for his pace which he had from an early age. At the Ngaruawahia Annual Athletic Championships in early 1922 he placed first in the 100 yard, and 220 yard races, and second in the 40 yard race.

In 1922 he moved to Auckland early in the season to play in the Auckland Rugby League competition for the Newton Rangers. He made his Auckland début against New South Wales in the same season as a seventeen-year-old. After the 1923 season, Brown went to England and played for Wigan as an amateur in several reserve games. On his return, Brown joined City. Newton appealed, which was upheld by both the Auckland Rugby League, and the New Zealand Rugby League. As a result, he was suspended but after a protracted struggle was eventually released by Newton to play for City.

In 1927 he returned to England, joining Wigan as a professional.

Brown also played for Halifax and York. In May 1934 Brown suffered a severe throat cut and was hospitalised in a serious condition. He had written letters intimating that he was keen to return to New Zealand and this injury came as a shock. The York League Football Club were unaware of his desire to return to New Zealand and said that they were happy to allow him to return to New Zealand on a "vacational visit". He did indeed return to Auckland in time to represent New Zealand in 1935. He also had further stints in France, with Bordeaux and Bramley before suffering the illness that caused his death in 1947.

Representative career
Brown debuted for New Zealand on their 1925 tour of Australia where he played in 9 matches and scored 4 tries. Brown won caps for New Zealand in 1926 against England (2 matches) and Wales, in 1927 against England, in 1935 against Australia (3 matches), and in 1936 against England (2 matches), and won cap(s) for Other Nationalities while at Wigan against England. Brown was part of the 1926-27 tour of Great Britain that was marred by player discontent. He captained the Kiwis in one test match against Australia in 1935. In the same season he also made 2 appearances for the Auckland Māori team which was in its second ever season. He scored 4 tries in their wins over Takahiwai from Northland, and Hawke's Bay Māori.

Challenge Cup Final appearances
Brown played , i.e. number 5, and scored a try in Wigan's 13–2 victory over Dewsbury in the 1928-29 Challenge Cup Final at Wembley Stadium, London on Saturday 4 May 1929.

County Cup Final appearances
Brown played , i.e. number 2, and scored a try in Wigan's 5–4 victory over Widnes in the 1928 Lancashire County Cup Final during the 1928–29 season at Wilderspool Stadium, Warrington on Saturday 24 November 1928.

Death
Brown died in Auckland on 3 June 1947 and was buried at Waikaraka Cemetery. In an obituary in the Gisborne Herald it was written that "one of the finest wing three-quarters New Zealand has produced, Lou Brown, has died in Auckland". And that "Brown was rated as the finest wing three-quarter in England in 1929 when he scored a record tally of 43 tries in the season. The Otago Daily Times also mentioned that he had in fact played rugby league for the French international side saying "when the game was introduced into France, he went across the channel as a coach, and had the distinction, unique, surely in sporting annals, of playing for that country. One of Lou Brown's most prized possessions was a medal which was presented to him by the French Rugby League commemorating his inclusion in the team"

References

External links
Statistics at wigan.rlfans.com

1905 births
1947 deaths
Auckland rugby league team players
Bramley RLFC players
Burials at Waikaraka Cemetery
City Rovers players
Halifax R.L.F.C. players
New Zealand national rugby league team captains
New Zealand national rugby league team players
New Zealand rugby league players
Newton Rangers players
Ngaruawahia Panthers players
North Island rugby league team players
Other Nationalities rugby league team players
Place of birth missing
Rugby league centres
Rugby league wingers
Wigan Warriors players
York Wasps players